Hassan Peña (born March 25, 1985) is a Cuban professional baseball pitcher for the Algodoneros de San Luis of the Liga Norte de México. 

In the Cuban National Series, Pena pitched for the Metropolitanos and the Industriales. He was kept off of the Cuban national baseball team because he had relatives in the United States, and it was feared that he might defect. As a result, he defected in 2005.

Career

Washington Nationals
After attending Palm Beach Community College, he was selected by the Washington Nationals in the 13th round of the 2006 amateur draft.

Peña did not play in the Nationals' system in 2006.  He spent the 2007 season with the Vermont Lake Monsters in the short-season New York–Penn League.  In 13 starts, he pitched 59⅓ innings, compiling a win-loss record of 4–5 and an ERA of 4.25. In 2008, he pitched for the Potomac Nationals and the Hagerstown Suns, and in 2009 he pitched for the GCL Nationals and Hagerstown. In 2010, he spent the season with the Double-A Harrisburg Senators. In 2011, he pitched for Harrisburg and Triple-A affiliate Syracuse Chiefs. He pitched for Syracuse in 2012 became a free agent after the season.

Tigres de Quintana Roo
On April 13, 2013, Peña signed with the Tigres de Quintana Roo of the Mexican Baseball League. He elected free agency on November 1, 2013.

Kansas City Royals
On February 18, 2014, Peña signed a minor league contract with the Kansas City Royals organization. He was released on April 24, 2014.

Second stint with Quintana Roo
On July 1, 2014, Peña signed with the Tigres de Quintana Roo of the Mexican Baseball League. He was released on July 14, 2014.

Sultanes de Monterrey
On July 15, 2014, Peña signed with the Sultanes de Monterrey of the Mexican Baseball League. He was released on April 2, 2017.

Somerset Patriots 
On March 31, 2017, Peña signed with the Somerset Patriots of the Atlantic League of Professional Baseball. He was released on May 5, 2017.

Piratas de Campeche
On February 8, 2018, Peña signed with the Piratas de Campeche of the Mexican Baseball League. He was released on April 2, 2018.

Olmecas de Tabasco
On April 6, 2018, Peña signed with the Olmecas de Tabasco of the Mexican Baseball League. He was released on April 10, 2018.

Third stint with Quintana Roo
On July 27, 2018, Peña signed with the Tigres de Quintana Roo of the Mexican League. He became a free agent after the season.

Algodoneros de San Luis
On March 21, 2019, Peña signed with the Algodoneros de San Luis of the Liga Norte de México.

References

External links

 

Living people
1985 births
Metropolitanos de La Habana players
Industriales de La Habana players
Vermont Lake Monsters players
Hagerstown Suns players
Potomac Nationals players
Gulf Coast Nationals players
Harrisburg Senators players
Leones de Ponce players
Cuban expatriate baseball players in Puerto Rico
Syracuse Chiefs players
Tomateros de Culiacán players
Cuban expatriate baseball players in Mexico
Tigres de Quintana Roo players
Navegantes del Magallanes players
Cuban expatriate baseball players in Venezuela
Águilas del Zulia players
Northwest Arkansas Naturals players
Sultanes de Monterrey players
Somerset Patriots players
Piratas de Campeche players
Olmecas de Tabasco players
Algodoneros de San Luis players
Defecting Cuban baseball players
Baseball players from Havana
EDA Rhinos players
Cuban expatriate baseball players in Taiwan